The Sunraysia Football and Netball League, also known simply as the SFNL is an Australian rules league in the Sunraysia district of north-west Victoria and south-west New South Wales. Nine clubs –  Mildura, South Mildura, Imperials, Irymple, Red Cliffs, Merbein, Robinvale–Euston, Ouyen United and Wentworth – participate in the competition, which includes senior and junior grades of football and netball. The SFNL is considered a major country league. The league's grand final is traditionally played at City Oval in Mildura.

History
The Sunraysia Football League was formed in 1945, replacing the earlier Mildura Football League (which existed from 1903 to 1920) and the Mildura District Football League (which existed from 1921 to 1944).

Stance on Violence
Irymple Football Club is working with Kim O'Reilly to educate players around healthy relationships and violence against women. O'Reilly was seriously assaulted by ex-Irymple player Jake Frecker.

Irymple Club president Dennis Mitchell has called for Football clubs to change their culture around violence, condemning the support Dimboola Football Club provided to Frecker after he was charged with the assault on O'Reilly,"When your sporting club is the heart of the community, then it is our responsibility to be a vehicle for [education on family violence]"

Clubs

Current

Former clubs

(*) Ouyen competed between 1979 - 1982

Premiers

1945 RAAF 
1946 Mildura
1947 University
1948 Merbein
1949 Imperials 
1950 Imperials
1951 Mildura
1952 Mildura 
1953 Red Cliffs
1954 Irymple 
1955 Mildura
1956 Imperials
1957 Imperials
1958 Mildura
1959 Red Cliffs 
1960 Mildura 
1961 Red Cliffs 
1962 Merbein 
1963 Merbein 
1964 Red Cliffs 
1965 Robinvale 
1966 Irymple 
1967 Robinvale 
1968 South Mildura 
1969 South Mildura
1970 South Mildura 
1971 Imperials 
1972 Robinvale  
1973 Wentworth District 
1974 Robinvale 
1975 Merbein 
1976 Irymple 
1977 Imperials 
1978 Irymple 
1979 Robinvale 
1980 Red Cliffs
1981 Red Cliffs 
1982 Mildura 
1983 Red Cliffs 
1984 Wentworth District 
1985 Red Cliffs 
1986 Imperials 
1987 Imperials 
1988 Imperials 
1989 Robinvale 
1990 Imperials 
1991 Robinvale 
1992 Imperials 
1993 Imperials 
1994 Imperials 
1995 Imperials 
1996 Wentworth District 
1997 Robinvale 
1998 South Mildura 
1999 Imperials 
2000 Red Cliffs 
2001 Wentworth District
2002 Merbein 
2003 Merbein
2004 Imperials 
2005 Imperials 
2006 Irymple 
2007 Mildura
2008 Imperials 
2009 Wentworth District
2010 Robinvale
2011 Irymple
2012 Wentworth District
2013 Imperials
2014 Red Cliffs
2015 Red Cliffs
2016 Ouyen United
2017 Irymple
2018 Ouyen United
2019 Irymple
2020 Recess due to COVID19 pandemic 
2022 Irymple

Leading goalkickers

2009 Ladder

2010 Ladder

2011 Ladder

2012 Ladder

2013 Ladder

2014 Ladder

2015 Ladder

2016 Ladder

2017 Ladder

2018 Ladder

2019 Ladder

External links 
 Full Points Footy -Sunraysia Football League
League website

References 

Sport in Mildura
Australian rules football competitions in Victoria (Australia)
Australian rules football competitions in New South Wales
1945 establishments in Australia